Cammy Thomas is an American poet. Her first book, Cathedral of Wish, received the Norma Farber First Book Award from the Poetry Society of America.  A fellowship from the Ragdale Foundation helped her complete her second, Inscriptions. Her third collection, Tremors, appeared in 2021. All are published by Four Way Books. Two of her poems, under the title  Far Past War, were set to music by her sister, composer Augusta Read Thomas.  The premiere of this choral work was performed by the Cathedral Choral Society at the National Cathedral in Washington, D.C. in March, 2022. Thomas currently lives in Bolton, Massachusetts.

Published works

Full-length poetry collections

 Tremors (Four Way Books, 2021)
 Inscriptions (Four Way Books, 2014)
Cathedral of Wish (Four Way Books, 2005)

Poems and links

 Pandemic Poems (Indolent Books' What Rough Beast poem-a-day series, Oct., 2020)
 The Crypt of the Capuchins (Image Journal, Issue 107)
 The Blues in My Heart, The Rhythm in My Soul (The Missouri Review, 2017)
 November 1968 (Indolent Books, 2017)

Honors and awards 

 2006 Norma Farber First Book Award from the Poetry Society of America
 Ragdale Fellowship, 2007

References

External links 
 

Living people
Year of birth missing (living people)
Place of birth missing (living people)
21st-century American poets
American women poets
21st-century American women writers